The Youngstown Playhouse, is a community theater located in the former industrial center of Youngstown, Ohio.

Early years 
The Youngstown Playhouse traces its origins to February 16, 1924, when several local drama organizations formed a single organization called the Youngstown Players. With the support of local civic leaders, the group eventually secured its own building. The Youngstown Playhouse was initially housed in a renovated 19th-century barn. In 1940, supporters of the Playhouse raised $30,000 to build a new facility. Instead, the money was used to renovate a vacant movie house for live theater. Two years later, the Playhouse christened its new location with a production of "Camille of Roaring Camp".

Transformation 
During World War II, the Youngstown Playhouse raised its artistic standards considerably. Under the artistic direction of Broadway director Arthur Sircom, the Playhouse became known as a training ground for professional actors. Local theatrical figures who gained experience at the Youngstown Playhouse included the late dramatic screen actress Elizabeth Hartman. In 1959, the Playhouse moved to a new two-theater building on Glenwood Avenue.

References

External links
 Official website

Buildings and structures in Youngstown, Ohio
Theatres in Ohio
Tourist attractions in Youngstown, Ohio